Liskeard is a small ancient stannary and market town in south-east Cornwall, South West England. The Bodmin Moor lies to the north-west of the town. The total population of the town at the 2011 census was 11,366

History

The Cornish place name element Lis, along with ancient privileges accorded the town, indicates that the settlement was once a high status 'court'. King Dungarth whose cross is a few miles north near St Cleer is thought to be a descendant of the early 8th century king Gerren of Dumnonia and is said to have held his court in Liskeard (Lis-Cerruyt). Liskeard (Liscarret) was at the time of the Domesday Survey an important manor with a mill rendering 12d. yearly and a market rendering 4s. William the Conqueror gave it to Robert, Count of Mortain by whom it was held in demesne. Ever since that time it has passed with the earldom or Duchy of Cornwall. A Norman castle was built there after the Conquest, which eventually fell into disuse in the later Middle Ages. By 1538 when visited by John Leland only a few insignificant remains were to be seen. Sir Richard Carew writing in 1602 concurred;

Historically, Liskeard belonged to the ancient hundred of West Wivelshire

Liskeard was one of the 17 Antiqua maneria of the Duchy of Cornwall. The market charter was granted by Richard, Earl of Cornwall (brother of Henry III) in 1240. Since then, it has been an important centre for agriculture. The seal of the borough of Liskeard was Ar. a fleur-de-lis and perched thereon and respecting each other two birds in chief two annulets and in flank two feathers.

When Wilkie Collins wrote of his visit to the town in his Rambles Beyond Railways he had a low opinion of it: "that abomination of desolation, a large agricultural country town". The town went through a period of economic prosperity during the pre-20th century boom in tin mining, becoming a key centre in the industry as a location for a stannary and coinage.

The A38 trunk road used to pass through the town centre but a dual carriageway bypass now carries traffic south of the town, leaving the town centre accessible but with low traffic levels.

Present day

Liskeard was one of the last towns in Cornwall to have a regular livestock market, ending in 2017. There is a range of restaurants, cafés and pubs in the town, and some shops retain their Victorian shopfronts and interiors.

Liskeard puts on a pantomime in the last week of January and holds a carnival every June. Every July, Liskeard holds a large agricultural show, The Liskeard Show, which is always held on the second Saturday in July. St Matthew's Fair was originally established by charter in 1266, the fair was re-established in 1976 which runs in September/October. Every December, there is street entertainment and a lantern parade for 'Liskeard Lights Up', when the Christmas lights are switched on.

Notable buildings

The town boasts St. Martin's, the second largest parish church in Cornwall  Built on the site of the former Norman church, the oldest parts of the current structure date back to the 15th century. Other places of worship include a Roman Catholic church and Methodist chapels.

The Foresters Hall now houses the Tourist Information Office and Liskeard & District Museum. The Foresters still meet in the town at the Public Rooms in West Street.
Stuart House (on the Parade) was used by Charles I as a lodging in 1644, when his forces were chasing the Parliamentarians. Restored, it is now used as a community building for arts, heritage and community events
Luxstowe House (1831). Designed by George Wightwick for William Glencross.
Liskeard Guildhall was built in 1859 and has a prominent clock tower.
The Public Hall was constructed in 1890.
Webb's House (formerly Webb's Hotel) is a classic early Victorian market-town hotel featuring in royal visits, parliamentary declarations and much more but recently converted into flats and is the home of the local newspaper The Cornish Times.
Pencubitt House was built in 1897 for J. H. Blamey, a wealthy wool merchant. The house was designed by local architect John Sansom, responsible for many Liskeard homes of that period.
The Liskeard Union Workhouse, architect John Foulston of Plymouth (later the Lamellion Hospital, now flats).
 The Pipe Well, a holy well.

Politics

Local politics
Liskeard is a civil parish, with some services provided by the unitary authority of Cornwall Council. There are 3 electoral wards for Cornwall Council in Liskeard, including Dobwalls. Liskeard was the admin HQ of the former Caradon District Council.

UK Parliament

In the year 1294, Liskeard began to send two members to Parliament, but this was reduced to one by the 1832 Reform Act. The Members of Parliament (MPs) have included Edward Gibbon, author of The History of the Decline and Fall of the Roman Empire, and Isaac Foot.

Liskeard is now part of the South East Cornwall constituency, currently represented by a Conservative Member of Parliament, Sheryll Murray in the House of Commons.

Education
The first school in Liskeard was founded in 1550 on Castle Hill. For a time it was maintained by the Earls of St Germans, but it closed around 1834 due to a decline in numbers and financial difficulties. From 1835 a series of private schools existed in the borough, until 1908 when Cornwall Education Committee built the County School at Old Road. From 1945 it was known as Liskeard Grammar School until September 1978 when it became the Lower School site of Liskeard School, following amalgamation with the town's secondary modern school.

Liskeard County Secondary School received its first pupils on Monday 12 September 1960, and was formally opened by the Minister of Education, Sir David Eccles on 7 July the following year. Costing £100,000, it was built to accommodate around 500 pupils on the site of the current school at Luxtowe. Its glass and steel structure made "free use of fresh air and sunlight" according to local newspaper reports, whilst other modern features included a well-equipped gymnasium, automated central heating and synchronised clocks across the school, operated from the secretary's office. A new block was opened by the Right Honourable Margaret Thatcher, Secretary of State for Education and Science in 1974, following the raising of the school leaving age from 15 years to 16, two years earlier. Like many similar secondary schools in Cornwall, from the late 1970s it housed the Upper School (3rd Year / Year 9 upwards), when it merged with the town's grammar school to create a split-site comprehensive school.

Twenty years later, with increased pupil numbers requiring many to be taught in temporary buildings, the need for improvements to Liskeard's secondary and primary schools was being raised in Parliament. By the late 1990s, Liskeard School and Community College had been extended at Luxstowe, and the Old Road site closed and redeveloped for housing. Further multimillion-pound science and technology facilities were added in 2002, and the original 1960s and 1970s buildings were completely modernised by 2011. As Cornwall's only school with an engineering speciality, it now caters for approximately 1300 students aged between 11 and 19, and employs around 200 teaching and non-teaching, full- and part-time staff. It also has a creche, a teenage advice and information service, a centre for children with autism, and facilities at Moorswater where some engineering-based courses are taught.

There are two primary schools in Liskeard: St Martin's Church of England (Voluntary Aided) School in Lake Lane and Hillfort Primary School on Old Road. The latter was opened in September 2006 following the renaming of Liskeard Junior School after its merger with Liskeard Infant School.

Caradon Short Stay School (previously known as a Pupil Referral Unit) is located in West Street, on the site of the former Liskeard Infant School. It provides education for students aged 11–16 from across south east Cornwall who are unable to attend a mainstream school or special school. The nearest independent schools are in Plymouth and Tavistock, Devon.

Transport
Liskeard railway station, on the London Paddington to Penzance Cornish Main Line, and the A38 trunk road provide the town with rapid access to Plymouth, the rest of Cornwall and the motorway network. The town is also served by the Looe Valley branch line to Looe. There are regular bus services to various parts of Cornwall.

Leisure and sports
There is a leisure centre at Lux Park on the north side of the town: there is a bowling club on the southern side. The town has a Non-League football club Liskeard Athletic F.C. who play at Lux park. The town also has a rugby and cricket club who are both well-supported. The town has a King George V Playing Field. Live music and various theatrical events frequently take place in the unusual but acoustically good Carnglaze Caverns just to the north.

Leisure trails
There are three trails, each has its own blue commemorative plaque (these were unveiled by former town mayor, Sandra Preston).
Footpath from the town to the railway station: the path was built by Thomas Lang, who was a former mayor, in 1890.
Trail around the north of the town centre, including the Parade and the ornamental fountain. The fountain was given to the town by Michael Loam, whose father (also called Michael Loam) invented the Man engine (a device for lifting men up and down mineshafts, and used in many mines throughout Cornwall & West Devon).
Trail around the southern part of the town, commemorating Lt. Lapenotière, who brought back the news of the Battle of Trafalgar to England. For this Lt. Lapenotière was given a silver spice sprinkler by King George III. The sprinkler is still owned by the mayor's office, and is exhibited occasionally.

Media

Liskeard has its own community radio station Liskeard Radio broadcasting full time online. Its local newspaper is the Cornish Times.

Freemasonry
Liskeard has a sizeable Masonic presence with no fewer than eight Masonic bodies meeting at the Masonic Hall on The Parade,

 St Martin's Lodge No. 510  Date of Warrant, 5 March 1845
 St Martin's Royal Arch Chapter No. 510 Consecrated on 1 August 1865
 St Martin's Lodge of Mark Master Masons No. 379 Consecrated on 26 January 1888
 St Martin's Lodge of Royal Ark Mariners No. 379 Consecrated 1 June 1933
 Duchy Chapter of the Ancient & Accepted Rite of the Rose Croix of Heredom No. 289 Warranted on 10 December 1931
 Duchy Conclave of the Order of the Secret Monitor No. 260 Consecrated on 8 April 1975
 St Martin's Chapel No.27 of the Commemorative Order of St Thomas of Acon, Consecrated in 1998
 St Germans Court No. 97 of the Masonic Order of Athelstan, Consecrated in 2014

In addition to the UGLE lodges + Masonic orders, there is also a women's lodge that meets in the Masonic Hall.

Twinning 
In 1974 Liskeard was twinned with Quimperlé (Kemperle) in Brittany, France.

Notable people

Richard Coad – architect
Richard Hardinge (c1593-1658) – delivered message from King Charles II to Essex the parliamentarian at Liskeard Aug 1644
Emily Hobhouse – welfare campaigner
Joseph Jane (died 1660) – Royalist politician
William Henry Paynter – antiquarian and folklorist
Trevor Woodman – former England rugby international, part of the 2003 Rugby World Cup winning team

Climate
Like all of the United Kingdom, Liskeard has an oceanic climate (Köppen climate classification Cfb).

Freedom of the Town
The following people and military units have received the Freedom of the Town of Liskeard.

Military Units
 The Royal British Legion (Liskeard Branch): 14 August 2022.

See also

 Liskeard and Caradon Railway
 Liskeard and Looe Railway
 Liskeard and Looe Union Canal

References

External links

 Liskeard Town Council
 Visit Liskeard
 
 Cornwall Record Office Online Catalogue for Liskeard

 
Market towns in Cornwall
Civil parishes in Cornwall
Towns in Cornwall
Cornish Killas
Manors in Cornwall